The 1932 European Rowing Championships were rowing championships held on the Sava in the Yugoslav capital city of Belgrade. The competition was only for men and they competed in all seven Olympic boat classes (M1x, M2x, M2-, M2+, M4-, M4+, M8+). It was held from 2 to 4 September.

Medal summary

References

European Rowing Championships
European Rowing Championships
Rowing
Rowing
International sports competitions in Belgrade
European Rowing Championships
European Rowing Championships